The Leyland Hippo Mk II was a heavy general service cargo truck used by the British Army and Royal Air Force during World War II and the immediate post-war years.

History
Throughout 1939 and 1940 the British Armed Forces took delivery of 330 Leyland Hippo Mk Is. Also known as the WSW17, the Hippo Mk I was a militarised version of the pre-war Leyland Hippo truck with an open military cab and body.

The Leyland Hippo Mk II was a new design by Leyland, developed as a result of the planning for D-Day, which concluded that trucks with  cargo capacity offered considerable logistic advantages over smaller vehicles. Design of the Hippo Mk II commenced in 1943 with production commencing in late 1944. The Hippo Mk II arrived too late to see service in the days immediately after D-Day, but roughly 1,000 were in service by VE Day and they remained in service with the British Army and the Royal Air Force into the 1950s.

Design
The Leyland Hippo Mk II was a wheeled 6x4 truck, powered by a  Leyland six-cylinder inline diesel engine, through a five-speed gearbox and two-speed auxiliary gearbox. The Hippo Mk II had a new two man enclosed steel cab with pull-down windows, the top portion of the cab could be removed to reduce the overall height for shipping. The Mk II was fitted with single tyres at the rear, the Mk IIA was fitted with narrower dual wheels at the rear, this necessitating the need to carry two spare tyres for the front and rear.

The standard general service Hippo Mk II body was a steel framed, timber well type incorporating the wheel arches which reduced the loading height, an important consideration given most of the loading and unloading was done by hand.  Steel hoops and a canvas cover gave weather protection and prevented identification of the load by the enemy.  Some Hippo Mk IIs were fitted with large van bodies and several with expanding bodies. The sides on the latter were split horizontally, the top half expanding up to give greater roof coverage, the bottom half down to give greater floor space, multiple vehicles could be linked together to form a consolidated workshop area.  Post-war bodies included a  refueller.

References

Military trucks of the United Kingdom
World War II vehicles of the United Kingdom
Soft-skinned vehicles
Hippo Mk II
Vehicles introduced in 1944